The Horse Range is a mountain range in Nye County, Nevada.

References 

Mountain ranges of Nevada
Mountain ranges of Nye County, Nevada
Mountain ranges of the Great Basin